Agostino Monorchio is an electrical engineer at the University of Pisa, Italy. He was named a Fellow of the Institute of Electrical and Electronics Engineers (IEEE) in 2012 for his contributions to computational electromagnetics and for his work on frequency selective surfaces in metamaterials.

References 

Fellow Members of the IEEE
Living people
Italian engineers
Year of birth missing (living people)
Place of birth missing (living people)